El Mejunje (Spanish for The Mixture), also known as El Mejunje de Silverio after the surname of its founder and director, Ramón Silverio, is a Cuban LGBT cultural center and space located in the city of Santa Clara. It lies on the central Calle Marta Abreu, near the corner with Calle Juan Bruno Zayas, close to the Parque Vidal and La Caridad Theatre, next to the Saint Claire of Assisi Cathedral.

History
Created as a simple gathering of bohemians and intellectuals, the centre grew as multifaceted and unconventional cultural space. It was installed in the ruins of an old hotel and started its activities in 1985. People related to the centre are colloquially known as Mejunjeros.

Cultural activities
The "Mejunje" is an LGBT cultural centre, involved into several social campaigns, as the ones on HIV/AIDS prevention, against homophobia and social discrimination. As for the meaning of its name and the purposes of its founder, El Mejunje is not a simple gay club: it is conceived as an open space shared by everyone independently of sexual orientation, to promote social integration. The activities of the centre include a theatre, a café, an art gallery in the second roof and a little music venue in which are held concerts of various musical genres, ranging from rock'n roll to Cuban folk music.

The activities also include social and cultural initiatives of interest to both children and adults, film screenings, and the Gay Saturday disco every Saturday night.

Gallery

See also

LGBT rights in Cuba
Ediciones El Puente
Cuban National Center for Sex Education (CENESEX)
Circuba

References

External links

 El Mejunje on EcuRed
Article about the Mejunje on The Havana Reporter
Article about the Mejunje on La Habana.com
 Article about the Mejunje on La Jiribilla

LGBT culture in Cuba
Buildings and structures in Santa Clara, Cuba
Tourist attractions in Santa Clara, Cuba
Cultural organizations based in Cuba
Theatres in Cuba
Art museums and galleries in Cuba
LGBT drinking establishments
Coffeehouses and cafés
Cuban music
1985 establishments in Cuba
20th-century architecture in Cuba